Ashley Matthew de Silva (born 3 December 1963) is a former Sri Lankan cricketer who played in 3 Tests and 4 ODIs from 1986 to 1993. He is, CEO of Sri Lanka Cricket.

De Silva was born in 1963 in Colombo into a Roman Catholic family. He attended Saint Joseph's College, Colombo, where he played in four of the annual Battle of the Saints against St. Peter's College, Colombo, the last—in 1982—as captain. He became the first former Saint Joseph's player to play Test cricket.

De Silva began his domestic cricket career for Tamil Union Cricket and Athletic Club in the Lakspray Trophy. He later moved to Colombo Cricket Club where he was playing when the competition attained First-class cricket status in 1989.

After his playing career, de Silva became a referee as well as taking charge of one List A match as an umpire in 2011.

In 2013, de Silva became acting CEO of Sri Lanka Cricket, later taking on the role permanently.

References

External links
 Ashley de Silva on ESPN

1963 births
Living people
Alumni of Saint Joseph's College, Colombo
Sri Lanka Test cricketers
Sri Lanka One Day International cricketers
Sri Lankan cricketers
Colombo Cricket Club cricketers
Wicket-keepers